Bloomfield Hatch is a hamlet in Berkshire, England, and part of the civil parish of Wokefield . It is located immediately to the East of Wokefield Park. Bloomfield Hatch Farm lies in the centre of the hamlet.

References

External links
Bloomfield Hatch Farm

Hamlets in Berkshire
West Berkshire District